The 1994 European Tour, titled as the 1994 Volvo Tour for sponsorship reasons, was the 23rd official season of golf tournaments known as the PGA European Tour.

The season was made up of 38 tournaments counting for the Order of Merit, and several non-counting "Approved Special Events".

The Order of Merit was won by Scotland's Colin Montgomerie for the second time, defending the title he won in 1993.

Changes for 1994
Aside from scheduling, initially there was just one change from the previous season, with the addition of the Extremadura Open. This created a sequence of five consecutive tournaments in Spain through February and March, and a total of nine events in the country although the Madrid Open would later be cancelled.

Shortly after the start of the season, the Roma Masters was cancelled and replaced by the Tournoi Perrier de Paris, a team event with prize money not counting towards the Order of Merit. In late January, a further tournament was added to the schedule with the inaugural Chemapol Trophy Czech Open, opposite the Toyota World Match Play Championship in mid-October. The Madrid Open, originally scheduled for 20–23 October, was cancelled with the Chemapol Trophy Czech Open taking the dates. In addition, the Kronenbourg Open was not held.

Schedule
The following table lists official events during the 1994 season.

Unofficial events
The following events were sanctioned by the European Tour, but did not carry official money, nor were wins official.

Order of Merit
The Order of Merit was titled as the Volvo Order of Merit and was based on prize money won during the season, calculated in Pound sterling.

Awards

See also
List of golfers with most European Tour wins

Notes

References

External links
1994 season results on the PGA European Tour website
1994 Order of Merit on the PGA European Tour website

European Tour seasons
European Tour